Cochin Jews (also known as Malabar Jews or Kochinim, from ) are the oldest group of Jews in India, with roots that are claimed to date back to the time of King Solomon. The Cochin Jews settled in the Kingdom of Cochin in South India, now part of the state of Kerala. As early as the 12th century, mention is made of the Jews in southern India by Benjamin of Tudela. They are known to have developed Judeo-Malayalam, a dialect of Malayalam language.

Following their expulsion from Iberia in 1492 by the Alhambra Decree, a few families of Sephardi Jews eventually made their way to Cochin in the 16th century. They became known as Paradesi Jews (or Foreign Jews). The European Jews maintained some trade connections to Europe, and their language skills were useful. Although the Sephardim spoke Ladino (i.e., Spanish or Judeo-Spanish), in India they learned Judeo-Malayalam from the Malabar Jews. The two communities retained their ethnic and cultural distinctions. In the late 19th century, a few Arabic-speaking Jews, who became known as Baghdadi, also immigrated to southern India, and joined the Paradesi community.

After India gained its independence in 1947 and Israel was established as a nation, most of the Malabar Jews made Aliyah and emigrated from Kerala to Israel in the mid-1950s. 
In contrast, most of the Paradesi Jews (Sephardi in origin) preferred to migrate to Australia and other Commonwealth countries, similar to the choices made by Anglo-Indians.

Most of their synagogues still exist in Kerala, with a few being sold or adapted for other uses.
Among the 8 synagogues that survived till the mid-20th century, only the Paradesi synagogue still has a regular congregation. Today it also attracts tourists as a historic site. 
Another synagogue at Ernakulam operates partly as a shop by one of few remaining Cochin Jews. A few synagogues are in ruins and one was even demolished and a two-storeyed house was built in its place.
The synagogue at Chendamangalam (Chennamangalam) was reconstructed in 2006 as Kerala Jews Life Style Museum. 
The synagogue at Paravur (Parur) has been reconstructed as Kerala Jews History Museum.

History

First Jews in South India

P. M. Jussay wrote that it was believed that the earliest Jews in India were sailors from King Solomon's time. It has been claimed that following the destruction of the First Temple in the Siege of Jerusalem of 587 BCE, some Jewish exiles came to India. Only after the destruction of the Second Temple in 70 CE are records found that attest to numerous Jewish settlers arriving at Cranganore, an ancient port near Cochin. Cranganore, now transliterated as Kodungallur, but also known under other names, is a city of legendary importance to this community. Fernandes writes, it is "a substitute Jerusalem in India". Katz and Goldberg note the "symbolic intertwining" of the two cities.

Dr. Ophira Gamliel notes however that the first physical evidence of Jews in South India dates only to the granting of the Kollam copper plates of the Syrian Christians, a trade deed of the year 849 C.E bestowed upon the Nestorian merchant magnate Maruvan Sapir Iso by Ayyan Atikal, the ruler of the Kingdom of Venad.The copper plates include signatures in Kufic, Pahlavi, and Hebrew and act as evidence of West Asian mercantilism in Kerala. 

In 1768, a certain Tobias Boas of Amsterdam had posed eleven questions to Rabbi Yehezkel Rachbi of Cochin. The first of these questions addressed to the said Rabbi concerned the origins of the Jews of Cochin and the duration of their settlement in India. In Rabbi Yehezkel's response (Merzbacher's Library in Munich, MS. 4238), he wrote: "after the destruction of the Second Temple (may it soon be rebuilt and reestablished in our days!), in the year 3828 of anno mundi, i. e., 68 CE, about ten thousand men and women had come to the land of Malabar and were pleased to settle in four places; those places being Cranganore, Dschalor, Madai [and] Plota. Most were in Cranganore, which is also called Mago dera Patinas; it is also called Sengale."

Saint Thomas, an Aramaic-speaking Jew from the Galilee region of Israel and one of the disciples of Jesus, is believed to have come to Southern India in the 1st century, in search of the Jewish community there.

A number of scholars have noted that the Cochin Jews maintain striking cultural similarities to the Knanaya, Jewish-Christian migrants from Persia who settled in Kodungallur, Kerala in the 4th or 8th century. These symmetries are noted in both the wedding traditions and especially the folk songs of the two communities, some songs maintaining the exact same lyrics with few corruptions and variations.

Central to the history of the Cochin Jews was their close relationship with Indian rulers. This was codified on a set of copper plates granting the community special privileges. The date of these plates, known as "Sâsanam", is contentious. The plates are physically inscribed with the date 379 CE, but in 1925, tradition was setting it as 1069 CE. Indian rulers granted the Jewish leader Joseph Rabban the rank of prince over the Jews of Cochin, giving him the rulership and tax revenue of a pocket principality in Anjuvannam near Cranganore, and rights to seventy-two "free houses". 

The Hindu king gave permission in perpetuity (or, in the more poetic expression of those days, "as long as the world, sun and moon endure") for Jews to live freely, build synagogues, and own property "without conditions attached". A family connection to Rabban, "the king of Shingly" (another name for Cranganore), was long considered a sign of both purity and prestige within the community. Rabban's descendants led this distinct community until a chieftainship dispute broke out between two brothers, one of them named Joseph Azar, in the 16th century.

The Jewish traveler Benjamin of Tudela, speaking of Kollam (Quilon) on the Malabar Coast, writes in his Itinerary:"[t]hroughout the island, including all the towns thereof, live several thousand Israelites. The inhabitants are all black, and the Jews also. The latter are good and benevolent. They know the law of Moses and the prophets, and to a small extent the Talmud and Halacha."These people later became known as the Malabari Jews. They built synagogues in Kerala beginning in the 12th and 13th centuries. The oldest known gravestone of a Cochin Jew is written in Hebrew and dates to 1269 CE. It is near the Chendamangalam Synagogue, built in 1614, which is now operated as a museum.

In 1341, a disastrous flood silted up the port of Cranganore, and trade shifted to a smaller port at Cochin (Kochi). Many of the Jews moved quickly, and within four years, they had built their first synagogue at the new community. 

The Portuguese Empire established a trading beachhead in 1500, and until 1663 remained the dominant power. They continued to discriminate against the Jews, although doing business with them. A synagogue was built at Parur in 1615, at a site that according to tradition had a synagogue built in 1165. Almost every member of this community emigrated to Israel in 1954.

In 1524, the Muslims, backed by the ruler of Calicut (today called Kozhikode and not to be confused with Calcutta), attacked the wealthy Jews of Cranganore because of their primacy in the lucrative pepper trade. The Jews fled south to the Kingdom of Cochin, seeking the protection of the Cochin Royal Family (Perumpadapu Swaroopam). The Hindu Raja of Cochin gave them asylum. Moreover, he exempted Jews from taxation but bestowed on them all privileges enjoyed by the tax-payers.

The Malabari Jews built additional synagogues at Mala and Ernakulam. In the latter location, Kadavumbagham Synagogue was built about 1200 and restored in the 1790s. Its members believed they were the congregation to receive the historic copper plates. In the 1930s and 1940s, the congregation was as large as 2,000 members, but all emigrated to Israel.

Thekkambagham Synagogue was built in Ernakulum in 1580, and rebuilt in 1939. It is the synagogue in Ernakulam sometimes used for services if former members of the community visit from Israel. In 1998, five families who were members of this congregation still lived in Kerala or in Madras.

A Jewish traveler's visit to Cochin
The following is a description of the Jews of Cochin by 16th-century Jewish traveler Zechariah Dhahiri (recollections of his travels circa 1558).
 They had been converted many years ago, of the natives of Cochin and Germany. They are adept in their knowledge of Jewish laws and customs, acknowledging the injunctions of the Divine Law (Torah), and making use of its means of punishment. I dwelt there three months, among the holy congregations.

1660 to independence

The Paradesi Jews, also called "White Jews", settled in the Cochin region in the 16th century and later, following the expulsion from Iberia due to forced conversion and religious persecution in Spain and then Portugal. Some fled north to Holland but the majority fled east to the Ottoman Empire. Both "Black Jews" and the "White Jews" (the Spanish Jews) of Malabar claimed that they are the true inheritors of the old Jewish culture.Some went beyond that territory, including a few families who followed the Arab spice routes to southern India. Speaking Ladino language and having Sephardic customs, they found the Malabari Jewish community as established in Cochin to be quite different. According to the historian Mandelbaum, there were resulting tensions between the two ethnic communities. The European Jews had some trade links to Europe and useful languages to conduct international trade   

When the Portuguese occupied the Kingdom of Cochin, they allegedly discriminated against its Jews. Nevertheless, to some extent they shared language and culture, so ever more Jews came to live under Portuguese rule (actually under the Spanish crown, again, between 1580 and 1640). The Protestant Dutch killed the raja of Cochin, allied of the Portuguese, plus sixteen hundred Indians in 1662, during their siege of Cochin. The Jews, having supported the Dutch military attempt, suffered the murderous retaliation of both the Portuguese and Malabar populations. A year later, the second Dutch siege was successful and, after slaughtering the Portuguese, they demolished most Catholic churches or turned them into Protestant churches (not sparing the one where Vasco da Gama had been buried). They were more tolerant of Jews, having granted asylum claims in the Netherlands. (See the Goa Inquisition for the situation in nearby Goa.)

The Paradesi Jews built their own house of worship, the Paradesi Synagogue. The latter group was very small by comparison to the Malabaris. Both groups practiced endogamous marriage, maintaining their distinctions. Both communities claimed special privileges and the greater status over each other.

In the early 20th century, Abraham Barak Salem (1882–1967), a young lawyer who became known as a "Jewish Gandhi", worked to end the discrimination against meshuchrarim Jews. Inspired by Indian nationalism and Zionism, he also tried to reconcile the divisions among the Cochin Jews. He became both an Indian nationalist and Zionist. His family were descended from meshuchrarim. The Hebrew word denoted a manumitted slave, and was at times used in a derogatory way. Salem fought against the discrimination by boycotting the Paradesi Synagogue for a time. He also used satyagraha to combat the social discrimination. According to Mandelbaum, by the mid-1930s many of the old taboos had fallen with a changing society.

Relations between the Cochin Jews, Madras Jews, and Bene Israel
Although India is noted for having four distinct Jewish communities, viz Cochin, Bene Israel (of Bombay and its environs), Calcutta, and New Delhi, communications between the Jews of Cochin and the Bene Israel community were greatest in the mid-19th century. According to native Bene Israel historian Haeem Samuel Kehimkar (1830-1909), several prominent members from the "White Jews" of Cochin had moved to Bombay in 1825 from Cochin, of whom are specifically named Michael and Abraham Sargon, David Baruch Rahabi, Hacham Samuel, and Judah David Ashkenazi. These exerted themselves not only in changing the minds of the Bene-Israel and of their children generally, but also particularly in turning the minds of these few of the Bene-Israel, who through heathen influence had gone astray from the path of the religion of their forefathers, to the study of their own religion, and to the contemplation of God. David Rahabi effected a religious revival at Revandanda, followed by his successor, Hacham Samuel. 

Although David Rahabi was convinced that the Bene Israel were the descendants of the Jews, he still wanted to examine them further. He therefore gave their women clean and unclean fish to be cooked together, but they singled out the clean from the unclean ones, saying that they never used fish that had neither fins nor scales. Being thus satisfied, he began to teach them the tenets of the Jewish religion. He taught Hebrew reading, without translation, to three Bene Israel young men from the families of Jhiratker, Shapurker and Rajpurker. David Rahabi is said to have been killed as a martyr in India, two or three years after coming upon the Bene Israel, by a local chief.

Another influential man from Cochin, who is alleged to have been of Yemenite Jewish origin, was Hacham Shellomo Salem Shurrabi who served as a Hazan (Reader) in the then newly formed synagogue of the Bene-Israel in Bombay for the trifling sum of 100 rupees per annum, although he worked also as a book-binder. While engaged in his avocation, he was at all times ready to explain any scriptural difficulty that might happen to be brought to him by any Bene Israel. He was a Reader, Preacher, Expounder of the Law, Mohel and Shochet. He served the community for about 18 years, and died on 17 April 1856.

Since 1947

 Along with China and Georgia, India is one of the only parts of Eurasia where antisemitism never took root, in spite of having a sizable Jewish population in the past. India became independent from British rule in 1947 and Israel established itself as a nation in 1948. With the heightened emphasis on the Partition of India into a secular republic of India and a semi-theocratic Pakistan, most of the Cochin Jews emigrated from India. Generally they went to Israel (made aliyah).
Many of the migrants joined the moshavim (agricultural settlements) of Nevatim, Shahar, Yuval, and Mesilat Zion. Others settled in the neighbourhood of Katamon in Jerusalem, and in Beersheba, Ramla, Dimona, and Yeruham, where many Bene Israel had settled. The migrated Cochin Jews still continue to speak Malayalam. Since the late 20th century, former Cochin Jews have also immigrated to the United States. It is recorded that currently only 26 Jews live in Kerala, who is located in different parts of Kerala such as Cochin, Kottayam and Thiruvalla. 

In Cochin, the Paradesi Synagogue is still active as a place of worship, but the Jewish community is very small. The building also attracts visitors as a historic tourist site.

Genetic analysis

Genetic testing into the origins of the Cochin Jewish and other Indian Jewish communities noted that until the present day the Indian Jews maintained in the range of 3%-20% Middle Eastern ancestry, confirming the traditional narrative of migration from the Middle East to India. The tests noted however that the communities had considerable Indian admixture, exhibiting the fact that the Indian Jewish people "inherited their ancestry from Middle Eastern and Indian populations".

Traditions and way of life

The 12th-century Jewish traveller Benjamin of Tudela wrote about the Malabari coast of Kerala: "They know the law of Moses and the prophets, and to a small extent the Talmud and Halacha." European Jews sent texts to the community of Cochin Jews to teach them about normative Judaism.

Maimonides (1135–1204), the preeminent Jewish philosopher of his day, wrote,
"Only lately, some well-to-do men came forward and purchased three copies of my code [the Mishneh Torah], which they distributed through messengers... Thus, the horizon of these Jews was widened, and the religious life in all communities as far as India revived."

In a 1535 letter sent from Safed to Italy, David del Rossi wrote that a Jewish merchant from Tripoli had told him the India town of Shingly (Cranganore) had a large Jewish population who dabbled in yearly pepper trade with the Portuguese. As far as their religious life, he wrote that they "only recognize the Code of Maimonides, and possessed no other authority or traditional law". According to the contemporary historian Nathan Katz, Rabbi Nissim of Gerona (the Ran) visited the Cochini Jews. They preserve in their song books the poem he wrote about them. In the Kadavumbhagam synagogue, a Hebrew school was available for both "children's education and adult study of Torah and Mishnah".

The Jewish Encyclopedia (1901-1906) said,
"Though they neither eat nor drink together, nor intermarry, the Black and the White Jews of Cochin have almost the same social and religious customs. They hold the same doctrines, use the same ritual (Sephardic), observe the same feasts and fasts, dress alike, and have adopted the same language Malayalam. ... The two classes are equally strict in religious observances",According to Martine Chemana, the Jews of Cochin "coalesced around the religious fundamentals: devotion and strict obedience to Biblical Judaism, and to the Jewish customs and traditions ... Hebrew, taught through the Torah texts by rabbis and teachers who came especially from Yemen."

 Piyyutim 
The Jews of Cochin had a long tradition of singing devotional hymns (piyyutim) and songs on festive occasions, as well as women singing Jewish prayers and narrative songs in Judeo-Malayalam; they did not adhere to the Talmudic prohibition against public singing by women (kol isha).

Judeo-Malayalam

Judeo-Malayalam is the traditional language of the Kochinim, spoken today by a few dozens of people in Israel and by probably fewer than 25 in India. In their antiquity, Malabar Jews may have used Judeo-Persian as evident from the Kollam Copper plates.

Judeo-Malayalam is the only known Dravidian Jewish language. Since it does not differ substantially in grammar or syntax from other colloquial Malayalam dialects, it is not considered by many linguists to be a language in its own right, but a dialect, or simply a language variation. Judeo-Malayalam shares with other Jewish languages like Ladino, Judeo-Arabic, and Yiddish, common traits and features. For example, verbatim translations from Hebrew to Malayalam, archaic features of Old Malayalam, Hebrew components agglutinated to Dravidian verb and noun formations and special idiomatic usages based on its Hebrew loanwords. Due to the lack of long-term scholarship on this language variation, there is no separate designation for the language (if it can be so considered), for it to have its own language code (see also SIL and ISO 639).

Unlike many Jewish languages, Judeo-Malayalam is not written using the Hebrew alphabet. It does, however, like most Jewish languages, contain many Hebrew loanwords, which are regularly transliterated, as much as possible, using the Malayalam script. Like many other Jewish languages, Judeo-Malayalam also contains a number of lexical, phonological and syntactic archaisms, in this case, from the days before Malayalam became fully distinguished from Tamil.

Cochin Jewish synagogues

A synagogue is called a beit knesset (Mal: ബേത് ക്‌നേസേത് | Heb: בית כנסת) in Judeo-Malayalam or "Jootha Palli" (Mal: ജൂതപള്ളി) with joothan meaning Jew in Malayalam and -palli a suffix added to prayer houses of the Abrahamic faiths. Throughout their history numerous synagogues have been constructed and lost to time. in their first settlement at Shingly (Cranganore), there were 18 synagogues as per their oral traditions. Today no archaeological evidence has been yet uncovered to validate these traditions. However the custom of naming their synagogues as "Thekkumbhagam" (lit: south side) and "Kadavumbhagam" (lit: River side) is cited as a cultural memory of two such synagogues that once stood in Muziris. Several oral songs sung by Cochini women also contain references to these synagogues. Apart from these, numerous Syrian Christian churches of the St. Thomas Christian community in Kerala claim to have been built on old synagogues, though archaeological evidence is scarce.

Synagogues believed to have existed or speculated on basis of oral traditions include:

 Madayi Synagogue, Madayi
 Cranganore Synagogue, Shingly
 Thekkumbhagam synagogue, Shingly
 Kadavumbhagam Synagogue, Shingly

Synagogues in recorded history whose location and/or remains have been lost in time:

 Palayoor Synagogue, Palur (known only from a rimon (ornament) bearing its name) 
 Kokkamangalam Synagogue, Kokkamangalam
 Kochangadi Synagogue,(1344 A.D - 1789 A.D) Kochangadi (oldest synagogue in recorded history)Saudi Synagogue, (1514 A.D-1556 A.D), Saude, a locality south of Fort Kochi.
 Tir-Tur Synagogue, (1745 A.D-1768 A.D) Thiruthur, KochiMuttam Synagogue (1800A.D), Muttam, Alappuzha
 Fort Kochi Synagogue, (1848 A.D), Fort Kochi (congregation of meschuhrarim)Seremban Synagogue, Seremban, Malaysia

Extant synagogues in Kerala:

 Kadavumbhagam Mattancherry Synagogue, (1130 A.D or 1539 A.D), Mattanchery
 Thekkumbhagam Mattancherry Synagogue, (1647 A.D), Mattanchery (demolished in 1960's)
 Chendamangalam Synagogue, (1420 or 1614 A.D), Chendamangalam
 Mala Synagogue, (1400 A.D or 1597 A.D), Mala
 Paravur Synagogue, (1164 A.D or 1616 A.D), Parur
 Kadavumbhagam Ernakulam Synagogue, (1200 A.D), Ernakulam
 Thekkumbhagam Ernakulam Synagogue, (1200 A.D or 1580 A.D), Ernakulam
 Paradesi Synagogue, (1568 A.D), Mattancherry (oldest active synagogue)

Cochini synagogues in Israel:

 Moshav Nevatim Synagogue, Nevatim (interiors taken from Thekkumbhagam Ernakulam Synagogue)Mesilat Zion Synagogue, Mesilat ZionNehemiah Motta Synagogue', Giv'at Ko'ah

Cochin Jewish surnames

Notable Cochini Jews
 Joseph Rabban, the first leader of the Jewish community of Kodungallur, was given copper plates of special grants from the Chera ruler Bhaskara Ravivarman II from Kerala
 Aaron Azar, among the last Jewish princes of Kodungallur
 Joseph Azar, the last Jewish prince of Kodungallur
Sarah bat Israel, whose tombstone (d. 1249 A.D) is the oldest found in India
Eliyah ben Moses Adeni, a 17th century Hebrew poet from Cochin.
Ezekiel Rahabi (1694–1771), chief Jewish merchant of the Dutch East India Company in Cochin
 Nehemiah ben Abraham (d. 1615 A.D), (Nehemiah Mutha), patron saint of Malabar Jews
 Abraham Barak Salem (1882–1967), Cochin Jewish Indian nationalist leader
Benjamin Meyuhasheem, the last Cochin Jew in Seremban, Malaysia
 Ruby Daniel (1912-2002), Indian-Israeli author and subject of Ruby of CochinMeydad Eliyahu, Israeli artist
Dr. Eliyahu Bezalel, renowned horticulturist
Elias "Babu" Josephai, caretaker of Kadavumbagam Synagogue
Sarah Jacob Cohen (1922-2019), the oldest member of the Paradesi community

 Gallery 

See also
 List of Synagogues in Kerala
 History of the Jews in India
 Gathering of Israel
Meshuchrarim
Paradesi Jews
Abraham Barak Salem
Joseph Rabban
 Judaism
 Anjuvannam

Notes

References
Fernandes, Edna. (2008) The Last Jews of Kerala. London: Portobello Books. 
 Koder, S. "History of the Jews of Kerala", The St. Thomas Christian Encyclopaedia of India, ed. G. Menachery, 1973.
 Puthiakunnel, Thomas. (1973) "Jewish Colonies of India Paved the Way for St. Thomas", The Saint Thomas Christian Encyclopedia of India, ed. George Menachery, Vol. II., Trichur.
 Daniel, Ruby & B. Johnson. (1995). Ruby of Cochin: An Indian Jewish Woman Remembers. Philadelphia and Jerusalem: Jewish Publication Society.	
 The Land of the Permauls, Or, Cochin, Its Past and Its Present  Day, Francis (1869). The Land of the Permauls, Or, Cochin, Its Past and Its Present, Cochin Jewish life in 18th century, read Chapter VIII (pp. 336 to 354), reproduced pp. 446–451 in ICHC I, 1998, Ed. George Menachery. Francis Day was a British civil surgeon in 1863.
Walter J. Fischel, The Cochin Jews, reproduced from the Cochin Synagogue, 4th century, Vol. 1968, Ed. Velayudhan and Koder, Kerala History Association, Ernakulam, reproduced in ICHC I, Ed. George Menachery, 1998, pp. 562–563
 de Beth Hillel, David. (1832) Travels; Madras.

 
 
 Jussay, P.M. (1986) "The Wedding Songs of the Cochin Jews and of the Knanite Christians of Kerala: A Study in Comparison". Symposium.
 
 Hough, James. (1893) The History of Christianity in India.
 Lord, James Henry. (1977) The Jews in India and the Far East. 120 pp.; Greenwood Press Reprint; 
 Menachery, George, ed. (1998) The Indian Church History Classics, Vol. I, The Nazranies, Ollur, 1998. 
 Katz, Nathan; & Goldberg, Ellen S; (1993) The Last Jews of Cochin: Jewish Identity in Hindu India. Foreword by Daniel J. Elazar, Columbia, SC: Univ. of South Carolina Press. 
 Menachery, George, ed. (1973) The St. Thomas Christian Encyclopedia of India B.N.K. Press, vol. 2, Lib. Cong. Cat. Card. No. 73-905568 ; B.N.K. Press

 Weil, Shalva. From Cochin to Israel. Jerusalem: Kumu Berina, 1984. (Hebrew)
 Weil, Shalva. "Cochin Jews", in Carol R. Ember, Melvin Ember and Ian Skoggard (eds) Encyclopedia of World Cultures Supplement, New York: Macmillan Reference USA, 2002. pp. 78–80.
 Weil, Shalva. "Jews in India." in M.Avrum Erlich (ed.) Encyclopaedia of the Jewish Diaspora, Santa Barbara, USA: ABC CLIO. 2008, 3: 1204–1212.
 Weil, Shalva. India's Jewish Heritage: Ritual, Art and Life-Cycle, Mumbai: Marg Publications, 2009. [first published in 2002; 3rd edn.].
 Weil, Shalva. "The Place of Alwaye in Modern Cochin Jewish History." Journal of Modern Jewish Studies. 2010, 8(3): 319-335
 Weil, Shalva.  "Cochin Jews" in Judith Baskin (ed.) Cambridge Dictionary of Judaism and Jewish Culture, New York: Cambridge University Press, 2011. pp. 107.
 

Further reading
 
 Katz, Nathan. (2000) Who Are the Jews of India?; Berkeley, Los Angeles and London: University of California Press. 
 Katz, Nathan; Goldberg, Ellen S; (1995) "Leaving Mother India: Reasons for the Cochin Jews' Migration to Israel", Population Review 39, 1 & 2 : 35–53.
George Menachery, The St. Thomas Christian Encyclopaedia of India, Vol. III, 2010, Plate f.p. 264 for 9 photographs,  
Paulose, Rachel. "Minnesota and the Jews of India", Asian American Press, 14 February 2012
 Weil, Shalva. "Obituary: Professor J. B. Segal." Journal of Indo-Judaic Studies. 2005, 7: 117–119.
 Weil, Shalva. "Indian Judaic Tradition." in Sushil Mittal and Gene Thursby (eds) Religions in South Asia, London: Palgrave Publishers. 2006, pp. 169–183.
 Weil, Shalva. "Indo-Judaic Studies in the Twenty-First Century: A Perspective from the Margin", Katz, N., Chakravarti, R., Sinha, B. M. and Weil, S. (eds) New York and Basingstoke, England: Palgrave-Macmillan Press. 2007.
 Weil, Shalva. "Cochin Jews(South Asia)." in Paul Hockings (ed.) Encyclopedia of World Cultures, Boston, Mass: G.K. Hall & Co.2. 1992, 71–73.
 Weil, Shalva. "Cochin Jews." in Carol R. Ember, Melvin Ember and Ian Skoggard (eds) Encyclopedia of World Cultures Supplement. New York: Macmillan Reference USA. 2002, pp. 78–80.
 Weil, Shalva. "Judaism-South Asia", in David Levinson and Karen Christensen (eds) Encyclopedia of Modern Asia. New York: Charles Scribner's Sons. 2004, 3: 284–286.
 
 Weil, Shalva. "Jews in India." in M.Avrum Erlich (ed.) Encyclopaedia of the Jewish Diaspora, Santa Barbara, USA: ABC CLIO. 2008.

External links

 Cochin Jews
(1687) Mosseh Pereyra de Paiva - Notisias dos Judeos de Cochim
 "Calcutta Jews", Jewish Encyclopedia, 1901-1906 edition
 "Cochin Jewish musical heritage", The Hindu, 15 May 2005
 news "Indian officials recount Cochin Jewish history", The Hindu'', 11 September 2003
 The Synagogues of Kerala
 Synagogues of Chendamangalam and Pavur, Kerala

 
Jews and Judaism in India
Kerala society
 
Jewish ethnic groups
Social groups of Kerala
Ethnic groups in Kerala
Judaism in Kerala